The 1885 St. Louis Browns season was the team's fourth season in St. Louis, Missouri, and the fourth season in the American Association. The Browns went 79–33 during the season, best in the American Association, and won their first AA pennant.  In the World Series, the Browns played the National League champion Chicago White Stockings.  The series ended in dispute, with each club winning 3 games with 1 tie.

Regular season 

Manager Charlie Comiskey finally was able to assemble and direct a team from start to finish the way he wanted. The result: a runaway championship.

The team was built on daring baserunning, clutch hitting, and the best pitching in the league. The team as a whole led the league in both earned run average (ERA) and overall runs allowed by a healthy margin over second-best Louisville. Individually, Dave Foutz was outstanding, as he won 33 of the 46 games he started and ranked fifth in ERA. His teammate Bob Caruthers was even better, compiling league-leading totals in wins (40), ERA (2.07) and winning percentage (a stellar .755).

The Browns took over first place to stay in the second week of May, but they made a joke of the race in July. On successive home stands, they had winning streaks of 17 and 12 games, combining for a major-league record 27-game winning streak at home that still stands as the best ever. They finished games laps ahead of the second-place Cincinnati Red Stockings and earned a berth in the World Series against the National League champion Chicago White Stockings.

Season standings

Record vs. opponents

Roster

Player stats

Batting

Starters by position 
Note: Pos = Position; G = Games played; AB = At bats; H = Hits; Avg. = Batting average; HR = Home runs; RBI = Runs batted in

Other batters 
Note: G = Games played; AB = At bats; H = Hits; Avg. = Batting average; HR = Home runs; RBI = Runs batted in

Pitching

Starting pitchers 
Note: G = Games pitched; IP = Innings pitched; W = Wins; L = Losses; ERA = Earned run average; SO = Strikeouts

World Series

 Game 1 (October 14): Darkness ends game one after 8 innings‚ with the teams tied 5–5.
 Game 2 (October 15): With Chicago leading 5–4 in the sixth inning, Browns manager Charles Comiskey calls his team off the field to protest a ruling made by umpire Dave Sullivan. The game is forfeited to Chicago.
 Game 6 (October 23): The series moves from Pittsburgh to Cincinnati‚ setting a record for the series played in the most cities. (It was also played in New York and St. Louis.) Chicago takes a 3–2 series lead by beating the Browns 9–2.
 Game 7 (October 24): Behind pitcher Dave Foutz, St. Louis defeats Chicago 13–4 in the 7th and last game. The Browns claim the game 2 forfeit didn't count and therefore claim the championship. The two clubs split the $1000 prize.

Notes

References 
1885 St. Louis Browns at Baseball Reference
1885 St. Louis Browns team page at www.baseball-almanac.com

St. Louis Cardinals seasons
Saint Louis Browns season
St Louis